La Vieille Taupe is a publishing house and bookshop in Paris, France. The establishment went through two distinct phases in its history. Between 1965 and 1972, it had a politically ultra-left slant. In 1980 a project with the same name was launched by one of La Vieille Taupe's previous participants and became renowned for publishing antisemitic and Holocaust denial literature.

Ultra-Left origins
The name means Old Mole and comes from a communist conception of the maturation of social forces beneath the surface of society which eventually erupt in revolutionary movements. The bookshop was founded in 1965 at 1, rue des Fossés-Saint-Jacques, Paris 5eme. It was the major source for texts by the Situationist International, Amadeo Bordiga and other ultra-left groups. Marx's Theses on Feuerbach were available as a poster thanks to Guy Debord. The situationists did much of the fly postering and along with Pouvoir Ouvrier who turned up for the opening party.

In 1966 the Situationists fell out with La Vieille Taupe and withdrew their publications. The bookshop continued as a focus of ultraleft activity until its closure in 1972. In 1973 La Vieille Taupe published La gauche allemande: Textes du KAPD, de L'AAUD, de L'AAUE et de la KAI (1920-1922) with La Vecchia Talpa (Naples) and Invariance.

Holocaust denial revival
In 1979 Pierre Guillaume approached Gérard Lebovici with a proposal to publish the Holocaust denial text Le Mensonge d'Ulysse by Paul Rassinier. Lebovici refused, so in 1980 Guillaume relaunched La Vieille Taupe as a negationist publishing house. Rassiner's book was the first published. Many of Guillaume's former associates deplore his reuse of the name for a purpose they regard as completely at odds with their former involvement. Some also regard Guillaume's suggestion that Guy Debord was a secret negationist as obscene. Some people view ultra-left negationism as evidence that the ultra-left and ultra-right are very similar - the meeting of the extremes. However most ultra left activists would distance themselves from all forms of negationism, and regard Guillaume's more recent development as a sad decline. Guillaume sees La Vieille Taupe as a genuine ultra left venture which concentrates on "exposing the lies of the capitalist victors of the Second World War", even if most of the people who listen to him are from the far-right.

External links

Book publishing companies of France
Jewish French history
Holocaust denial in France
Mass media in Paris